Al-Amali means "the dictations", and is the title of more than thirty books by Shia Muslim scholars. The most prominent of these are:

 Al-Amali (Shaykh Mufid)
 Al-Amali (Ibn Babawayh)

Islamic literature
Shia hadith collections
Shia theology books
Shia bibliography